The Flag of Secession is a song written in 1862 celebrating the secession of the southern states from the Union. The song is sung to the tune of "The Star-Spangled Banner", the national anthem of the United States. The author of the song is unknown.  It was included in Frank Moore's (ed.) Rebellion Record (New York: G.P. Putnam, 1864), vol. 3, "Poetry and Incidents," p. 38.

References

Wikisource

See also
 The Bonnie Blue Flag
 God Save the South
 Dixie (song)

Flags of the Confederate States of America
Songs of the American Civil War
1862 songs